James Prigoff (October 29, 1927 – April 21, 2021) was an American photographer, author, and lecturer focusing on public murals, graffiti, and spraycan art. He has traveled extensively throughout the world documenting these art forms, and his personal archive of 100,000 slides may well be the most comprehensive of any individual mural and graffiti documentarian.

Early life 

Prigoff was born in New York City and graduated high school in 1944 at age 16. He was an Honorable Mention Westinghouse Science Talent Search Winner and was accepted at Massachusetts Institute of Technology (MIT) in Cambridge, Massachusetts. He was an honor student all eight terms and an outstanding athlete in track and field. He received a "STRAIGHT T", the school's highest athletic award. Graduating MIT in 1947, Prigoff moved into the business world and also took up squash, achieving many National rankings. He was National Champion of Squash Tennis seven times in the 1960s. Prigoff was elected to the Explorers Club in New York City in 1967. In 1975 his name was included in a listing of 250 outstanding graduates of M.I.T.  In the late 1970s, he worked with Mark Rogovin and Marjorie Benton, founders of the Peace Museum in Chicago and was an original Board Member for many years.

Corporate career 
In 1947 Prigoff was employed in the factories of Shawmut Inc. in Stoughton, Massachusetts. He moved into sales in New York City, and later become President of his division, which was sold to Genesco. He was employed by Genesco for two years before being recruited as Executive Vice-President of Rosenau Bros. in Philadelphia. In 1970, he was recruited to be President of the Sportco Division of US Industries, and in 1975, he was recruited to become Senior Vice President of the Sara Lee Corporation in Chicago. At both USI and Sara Lee, his challenge was to restore profitability to companies purchased by conglomerates that had little experience in the businesses they had purchased. After five successful years with Sara Lee, Prigoff was recruited to join Levi Strauss in San Francisco as President of one of their divisions. The task was the same: To bring profitability and stability to a division that had grown too fast. After three years with Levi's, Prigoff retired in 1984 at the age of 57.

Historian, author, photography career 
In the early 1970s, Prigoff became interested in documenting public murals. He was intrigued by the community nature of the murals, their artistic merit, and their ability to address issues that were not normally found in newspapers, television, and other media. He travelled extensively amassing one of the largest documentations of this art form photographed by a single individual. Along the way, he could not help but notice the appearance of graffiti in New York City and Philadelphia. He began to document that as well.

Prigoff noted the emergence of subway graffiti appearing "above ground", and was interested to see how it had spread across the country, and eventually worldwide. He wrote to his friend Henry Chalfant and suggested that Henry join Prigoff in tracking the art form around the world. Together they produced Spraycan Art, published in 1987. The book sold well over 250,000 copies and is now considered one of the seminal books in the study of modern-day graffiti. Many graffiti writers learned about the art form from reading Spraycan Art, and initially perfected their skills by studying styles found in the book.

Prigoff later co-authored two books on traditional mural art with Robin Dunitz: Painting the Towns – Murals of California, and Walls of Heritage – Walls of Pride – History of African American Murals.

Prigoff has written forewords and assisted in the publication of several books on the subject of graffiti art. He also has written articles for many publications, and his photographs appear in numerous publications and catalogues. Of note, The History of American Graffiti features 48 of Prigoff's photos including its frontispiece.

In 2011, Jeffrey Deitch, Director at the Geffen LAMOCA, curated the ground breaking and record attendance show, "ART IN THE STREETS" with the help of Roger Gastman and Aaron Rose. Prigoff was one of a few photographers included in the show alongside the eminent graffiti artists. Many of his photographs appeared in the catalogue.

In April 2012, the Estria Foundation honored Prigoff, along with Judy Baca and Kent Twitchell, with the award of "Urban Legend" Estria was quoted as saying "James is considered one of the major forces in giving dignity and credibility to an art form that once was considered to be vandalism".

Over the years Prigoff has exhibited his photographs in many cities and has lectured around the world on the topic of public murals, graffiti, and spraycan art. He has also donated thousands of his photographs to historic archives.

Personal life 
Prigoff was married to his high school sweetheart, Dr. Arline Prigoff. The Prigoffs resided in Sacramento, California.

Publications 
 Spraycan Art, 1987, Thames and Hudson of London. James Prigoff and Henry Chalfant. 
 Painting the Towns – Murals of California (1997 – RJD Enterprises). James Prigoff and Robin Dunitz. ISBN o-9632862-4-2
 Walls of Heritage – Walls of Pride – History of African American Murals (2000 – Pomegranate Press). James Prigoff and Robin Dunitz. 
 Graffiti LA (2007 – Steve Grody) Harry N. Abrams, NYC – foreword 
 Graffiti NY (2009 – Eric Felisbret) Harry N. Abrams, NYC – foreword 
 HOW/NOSM – THE BRAZIL DIARIES, 2012, Running Press, Germany – foreword 
 Essay for the Marcos Raya Book – Chicago, 2004 –
 Foreword for "The Murals of John Pugh" – Ten Speed Press – Kevin Bruce 2006 
 Chapter for David M Newman's "Sociology" -Pine Forge Press–1000 Oaks Ca.-2004 
 "Murals and the Labor Movement"–Das Andre Amerika- show and catalogue –Berlin-83
 Detroit Art Museum Diego Rivera Show, Catalogue 1986 – 
 The History of American Graffiti – Gastman and Neelon – 2010 – Harper Design 
 Art in the Streets" – Geffen MOCA, LA – Frontispiece and several Photographs – 2012 – Skira Rizzoli

Press 
 Street Art SF
 MIT News – Nov/Dec 2007
 Social Archive
 Brooklyn Street Art
 Interview - @149st
 SF Mural Arts
 Love Oakland Group
 RadioSRQ Podcast
 Down The Avenue
 
 AEROSOLPLANET : INTERVIEW WITH JAMES PRIGOFF

Awards 
 Awarded the title of "Urban Legend" at the Urban Legends LA.Gallery show along with Judy Baca, founder of S.P.A.R.C. in Venice and muralist along with Kent Twitchell, American realist muralist.

Film 
 From Here to Canarsie – 1986 – with BLADE – co-producer with Henry Chalfant
 Who is Taki 183 – 2020 – with Taki 183 and Cornbread – co-produced with Cedric Godin.

Exhibitions

1990 
 War and Peace, West Berlin
 Art Against Racism, Vancouver

1994 
 Black Power – Black Art – 20 years of African American Murals, California State University, San Francisco
 Made in California – 1900–2000, Los Angeles Museum of Art, Los Angeles, 2000

2001 
 Painting and Politics, Social Political Art Resource Center, Venice, California
 Hip Hop Nation, Yerba Buena Art Center, San Francisco, California

2001–2011 
 Walls of Heritage – Walls of Pride – traveling Museum art show at the Smithsonian, Washington D.C. and six other venues – co curator and photographer.

2004 
 Cambridge Arts Council (CAC)- May 5 – June 30

2010 
 San Francisco Graffiti Retrospective, I AM Gallery, San Francisco

2011 
 Art in the Streets – LAMOCA, Los Angeles

2012 
 James Prigoff – Loyola University, Chicago

2017 
 James Prigoff – Art and Design Museum, Los Angeles
 Tate Modern, London – Soul of a Nation – 14 photographs

2018 
 Beyond the Streets – Los Angeles
 Brooklyn Museum, Brooklyn, NY – Soul of a Nation – 14 photographs
 Crystal Bridges Museum of American Art, Bentonville, Arkansas – Soul of a Nation – 14 photographs
 Oakland Museum of CA, Oakland, CA – RESPECT: Hip-Hop Style & Wisdom

2019 
 Beyond the Streets – NYC – store front photographs
 The Broad, Los Angeles, CA – Soul of a Nation
 de Young Museum, San Francisco, CA – Soul of a Nation
 Museum of Graffiti, Wynwood, FL
 Leave Your Mark – Solo Show – Sacramento, CA

2020 
 1 AM Gallery, San Francisco, CA – From Tags To Riches – Solo Show

Lectures 
 Chicago Art Institute
 S.F. Museum of Modern Art
 S.F. Art Institute
 Vancouver Art Museum
 Stanford University
 University of Southern California
 U.C.L.A.
 U.C. San Diego
 U.C. Berkeley
 Berkeley Art Museum
 U.C. Davis
 California College of the Arts
 C.S.U. SF and Sacramento
 Mural Arts Program, Philadelphia
 Universidad Nacional de Bogota, Colombia
 APECH, Santiago, Chile
 de Young Museum, SF.
 Ringling Museum and Sarasota Chalk Festival, Sarasota, Florida
 Pasadena Art Museum
 Loyola University, Chicago
 Ringling College of Art and Design
 Florida College
 1 AM Gallery

City lectures in 
 San Francisco
 Sacramento
 Chicago
 New Your City
 Boston
 Los Angeles
 San Diego
 Denver
 Paris
 London
 Belfast and Derry, Northern Ireland
 Uppsala, Sweden
 Sydney
 Melbourne
 Perth
 Auckland
 Edinburgh
 Florida

Donated Historical Archives 
 San Francisco Public Library – donation of 1,000 slides, S.F. murals and public art.
 Los Angeles at S.P.A.R.C. - donation of 1,000 slides, LA murals and public art.
 Chicago at the C.P.A.G. - donation of 1,000 slides, Chicago murals and public art.
 U.C. Santa Barbara – donation of 450 slides, San Diego murals by Victor Ochoa, Mario Torrero, and others including the famous "Chicano Park".

References 

1927 births
2021 deaths
Photographers from New York (state)
Writers from New York City
American art educators
Massachusetts Institute of Technology alumni